Edward William George Jarman (2 July 1907 – 9 May 2003) was an English professional golfer. He played in the 1935 Ryder Cup.

Jarman had four brothers who were also professional golfers, elder brothers Fred, Jack and Tom and younger brother Bob.

Professional wins
1933 Leeds Cup
1936 Leeds Cup

Results in major championships

Note: Jarman only played in The Open Championship.

NT = No tournament
CUT = missed the half-way cut
"T" indicates a tie for a place

Team appearances
Ryder Cup (representing Great Britain): 1935
England–Scotland Professional Match (representing England): 1935 (winners)

References

English male golfers
Ryder Cup competitors for Europe
People from Margate
1907 births
2003 deaths